Raouf Abdelkarim Abdelraouf (born 23 January 1978 in Cairo) is an Egyptian gymnast. He competed in the 2000 Summer Olympics.

References

External links
 

1978 births
Living people
Gymnasts at the 2000 Summer Olympics
Egyptian male artistic gymnasts
Olympic gymnasts of Egypt
Sportspeople from Cairo
20th-century Egyptian people